Carl Cannon could refer to: 

Carl Cannon (poker player)
Carl M. Cannon (born 1953), American journalist